The Melody Lingers On is an album by saxophonist Houston Person which was recorded in 2014 and released on the HighNote label.

Reception

In his review on Allmusic, Matt Collar states "A journeyman artist with a bent toward swinging soul-jazz, Person has developed into something of an American treasure over the past 30 years. Since the '90s, Person has released a steady stream of standards albums, heavy on lyrical and blues-based songs that perfectly exploit his distinctive, burnished tenor drawl. The Melody Lingers On is no exception, featuring a set of songs heavily weighted toward an intimate, afterglow vibe centered on the warm sound of Person's saxophone. ... At 79 years young, with The Melody Lingers On Person continues his reign as one of the titans of the lush jazz tenor sound". In JazzTimes, Mike Joyce wrote "Here’s veteran reedman Houston Person rolling in the deep again, his tone resonant as ever, his primary focus the Great American Songbook and its enduring lyricism. Unmistakably in his element, relaxed and yet fully engaged".

Track listing 
 "My Funny Valentine" (Richard Rodgers, Lorenz Hart) – 6:24
 "Gone Again" (Curtis Lewis, Gladys Hampton, Curley Hamner) – 4:42	Amazon	
 "You're Nearer (Rogers, Hart) – 4:31
 "Minton's" (Danny Mixon, Antoinette Montague) – 4:35
 "Bewitched" (Rogers, Hart) – 6:00
 "Only Trust Your Heart" (Benny Carter, Sammy Cahn) – 7:20
 "They All Laughed" (George Gershwin, Ira Gershwin) – 4:39
 "Try a Little Tenderness" (Jimmy Campbell, Reg Connelly, Harry M. Woods) – 5:47
 "The Song Is Ended" (Irving Berlin) – 5:14
 "You Can't Lose with the Blues" (Lafayette Harris) – 7:43

Personnel 
Houston Person – tenor saxophone
Lafayette Harris – piano 
Steve Nelson – vibraphone
Ray Drummond – bass 
Lewis Nash – drums

References 

Houston Person albums
2014 albums
HighNote Records albums
Albums recorded at Van Gelder Studio